The 1956 Yale Bulldogs football team represented Yale University in the 1965 NCAA University Division football season as a member of the Ivy League. They were led by fifth-year head coach Jordan Olivar and played their home games at the Yale Bowl. They finished the season as Ivy League champions with an overall record of eight wins and one loss.

Schedule

References

Yale
Yale Bulldogs football seasons
Ivy League football champion seasons
Yale Bulldogs football